The 48º Rally RACC Catalunya – Costa Daurada, alternatively RACC Rally de España, was the thirteenth and the final round of the 2012 World Rally Championship season. The rally took place over 9–11 November, and was based in Salou, Catalonia. The rally was also the final round of the Super 2000 World Rally Championship, Production World Rally Championship and WRC Academy.

Results

Event standings

 Note:  – The WRC Academy featured the first two legs of the rally.

Special stages

Power stage

The Power stage was the penultimate stage of the rally, 26.51 kilometers long Santa Marina. Additional points were given to three fastest drivers through the stage.

References

External links 
 
 Rally Catalunya at WRC.com 
 Rally Catalunya at eWRC.com
 Rally Catalunya at JUWRA.com

Catalunya
Rally Catalunya
Catalunya Rally